Sanam Pasha (Persian: صنم پاشا) (born in 1978, Tehran) is an Iranian songwriter, vocalist and vocal coach in rock and metal music. As a child, she learned Persian folk music and later went on to learn classical piano, vocals, and solfeggio. She also has an online Masters certificate in Songwriting and Vocals from the Berklee College of Music. She founded Sanam Pasha, an all-female rock band, in 2012.

Career 
Before the founding of Sanam Pasha in 2012, She had been actively engaged in singing, songwriting and composition.

Singing career 

 Vocal in “Thunder” rock- country band concerts, Iran, Tehran, 2012-2013 
 Lead vocal of “5grs” band in Arm fest, Armenia, Yerevan, 2013 
 Lead vocal of “5grs” band in Persian Metal Festival, Armenia, Yerevan, Summer 2012
 Leader of the choir band in Ra’ad NGO for disabled students, Iran, Tehran, November 2011 – present
 Studio vocal and lyricist for the metal album “Lets Crush”, Spring 2011 
 Studio vocal and lyricist for the metal album “Access denied”, Fall 2009 
 Studio vocal and lyricist for the metal album “Lets Crush”, Spring 2011
 Singer and pianist in the traditional Iranian band Keyhan concerts in Iran, Tehran, Gorgan 2010-2011 
 Vocal chanting and pianist for movie “Aramesh Miane Mordegan”, Fall 2005.
 Vocal chanting for the movie “Hamishe PayeYek Zan Dar Mian Ast” by Kamal Tabrizi, Winter 2008 
 Vocal chanting for a television series " Istgah ", Fall 2008
 Singing traditional for plays and rehearsals in Molavi Hall Festival  2007
 Vocal in “Ghogha” band in 22nd Fajr Music Festival, Winter 2004
 Lead singer in an underground rock concert with Arash Radan's band, summer 2003
 Back vocalist in the “Irania” band, 2005-2007
 Vocal in "Arte" Jazz fusion band, 2016 
 Lead vocal in From Isfahan to Isfahan Album with Farzin Tehranian 2015
 Back vocal in Baadzang's new song - Roozhaye Khoobe In Jahan 2021
 Back vocal in Hezar Hich album with Hamed Behdad 2021. 
 Vocalist and melody vocal writer Day & Night single 2020.
 Vocalist & Composer The Grey Single 2020
 Vocalist and Songwriter in Built On Blood Album 5grs, Metal East Records. 2022

Composition and songwriting career 
Pasha has composed many pieces for different films, animations, and plays. She has mentioned in an interview that the limitations imposed upon women's presence in the music scene of Iran have led her to pursue a more serious outlook in composition in the last few years.

 Composing music for the Animation of "What's the difference between me and a froget" by Ehsan Nasri, 2017
 Songwriting for 2 parts of the theater "Astane" by Elahe Moonesi 2016 
 Composing music for the theater " the one who said yes, the one who said no" by Majid Rahmati 2017 
 Composing music For the musical theatre "Life for Life" by Reza Bahrami 2016
 Composing music for 7 Theaters by Roohollah Jafari  (1-The Cherry Orchard 2-The Little Prince 3-Antigone 4-Blood Wedding 5-Macbeth 6-The last Godot), 2015 - City Theater of Tehran 
 Composing and singing in a short documentary "Pedar Bozorg Animation Iran" 2011 
 Composing and singing for the short movie "Sangbaran" by Samira Sinae 2008
 Composing music for movie "Shabi Dar Tehran" by Mehrdad Kazemi 2007 
 Composing Music for the theatre " Chah Akhshij" Directed by: Mehrav Nouri 2007
 Composing Music For the theatre with the name of "Piano" at Molavi Hall 2004
Composing music for Giti Theater Group's repertoire at Sanglach Hall 2019

The Sanam Pasha band 
The Sanam Pasha band is the first all-female rock band in Iran, which staged their first show on August 25, 2018 in Tehran. Despite the fact that, due to certain laws, only women were allowed to buy the tickets, the show sold out in two days. The band's members Sanam Pasha (vocalist, songwriter and the founder), Bita Sadeghi (Electric guitar), Rima Hassan Zadeh (Bass guitar), Armina Jafari (Drums), with the company of guest members Forooq Fazli (keyboard), Ava Hosseini (Backing vocalist), and Nava Hosseini (Backing vocalist), staged the band's first show.

Awards and certifications 

 The best scream singer at Arm Rock Fest, International Rock Competition, April 2013 
 The audience's first choice for composing, Mazmour Festival, Winter 2011 
 Berklee Celebrity scholarship in the name of singer/songwriter, Patty Larkin. Winter 2010 
 Certificate of Appreciation from Ra’ad Rehabilitation Goodwill Organization 2011 fall
 Certificate of Appreciation Rock Iran Winter 2012
 Certificate of Appreciation from the Iranian Artists Forum, 2009

Vocal coaching 
Pasha is also a vocal coach in Blues, Rock, and Metal music genres and has been present as a judge in many Iranian rock festivals and competitions. In 2008, she started a vocal contest, which has since then been held in the presence of other judges such as Farshid Arabi, Homayoun Majdzadeh and others. According to Pasha, the purpose of the contest was to provide a chance for the vocalists in rock genres, especially women, who do not enjoy an equal chance when it comes to the vocals.

References

External links 
 

Iranian rock musicians
Vocal coaches
Living people
1978 births
Musicians from Tehran
Berklee College of Music alumni